John Hall (1767–1833) was an American jurist who served as one of the original three justices of the North Carolina Supreme Court.  He was elected by the North Carolina General Assembly to the court in 1818 and served on that court from its first meeting in January 1819 until his declining health led him to retire in 1832.

Hall, a Staunton, Virginia native and alumnus of the College of William and Mary, moved to Warrenton, North Carolina to practice law and served as a state superior court judge (1800–1818).

References

External links
North Carolina Historical Markers

Justices of the North Carolina Supreme Court
1767 births
1833 deaths
19th-century American judges
People from Staunton, Virginia
People from Warrenton, North Carolina
College of William & Mary alumni